Gene Shift Auto is a top-down shooter battle royale video game developed and published by Nik Nak Studios. It is inspired by Grand Theft Auto 2 and features drivable vehicles and an unlockable skills system. The game was released as Geneshift on Steam via early access on May 23, 2017.

On November 16, 2022 the name was changed from Geneshift to Gene Shift Auto, and then went free to play on November 28, 2022.

References

Further reading 

 
 
 
 
 
 
 

Upcoming video games
Action video games
Battle royale games
Indie video games
Multidirectional shooters
Multiplayer and single-player video games
Video games with Steam Workshop support
Top-down video games
Video games developed in Australia
Windows games